Aragno is a frazione in the Province of L'Aquila in the Abruzzo region of Italy.

Frazioni of L'Aquila